Be Alright may refer to:
"Be Alright" (Ariana Grande song), 2016
"Be Alright" (Dean Lewis song), 2018
"Be Alright" (Kristine W song), 2009
"Be Alright" (Zapp song), 1981
"Be Alright", a 2013 song by Anttix
"Be Alright", a 2012 song by Justin Bieber from Believe